SgurrEnergy Private Limited is an Indian multinational company that provides expert engineering design, performance optimization, quality assurance and independent engineer services for new and operating Renewable energy Plants.

SgurrEnergy's headquarters and Renewable Energy Centre of Excellence are in Pune, India, with offices in India (Pune and Anand), China and KSA. SgurrEnergy has worked on projects in 40+ countries across four continents with notable projects in India, South Asia, Saudi Arabia, Jordan, Egypt, the Middle-East, Nigeria, Ethiopia, Ivory Coast, Sierra Leone, Togo, Uganda, Burkina Faso in Africa, Bangladesh, Romania in Eastern Europe and the United States.

SgurrEnergy mainly works with engineering, procurement and construction companies (EPCs), developers and lenders focused on building and operating renewable energy plants and state, national and local governments.

SgurrEnergy's has contributed to 75+GW in renewable energy capacity.

History 
SgurrEnergy, named after the Scottish Gaelic word for the rocky peaks of Scotland, was founded in 2002 in Glasgow, UK by a team of young engineers and the name continues to symbolize the company's Scottish heritage. SgurrEnergy was focused on wind energy in its early days before expanding to solar energy project and later battery and green hydrogen projects.

The founding team was led by Mr. Ian Irvine and Mr. Steve Macdonald, who had previously worked for Scottish Power and executed a number of wind energy projects. SgurrEnergy was founded because they identified a need for technical consulting services for renewable energy projects. The company experienced exponential growth and geographic expansion.

By 2010 SgurrEnergy had completed the technical due diligence (TDD) for 2 portfolios of solar PV plants of 20 MW each in Europe and established a technical centre of excellence in Pune, India to harness the ample engineering talent in India and build a team that can operate round the clock to grow into new spaces.

SgurrEnergy forayed into project management, quality assurance & inspection services and component bankability studies in 2011. SgurrEnergy also built-up design capabilities for substation design. SgurrEnergy started providing independent plant testing and acceptance services and had commissioned their first 10 MW solar PV project as a consultant in 2013.

Certifications 
SgurrEnergy received ISO 9001, 14001 and 45001 certifications in 2016 and went on to design India's first solar park, a 648 MW solar PV plant in Kamuthi, Tamil Nadu. This was also the first project for Adani Power and the world's largest solar PV plant when it was designed.

From 2016 onwards SgurrEnergy has worked on a wide range of solar configurations, hybrid plants and BESS and constantly evaluated and incorporated new products into designs for renewable energy plants.

Ethics & Corporate Social Responsibility 
SgurrEnergy operates either as a service provider or independent consultant, never both. 10% of SgurrEnergy’s revenue goes to charity. SgurrEnergy has supported the planting of 300 trees, regularly contributes clothes to Goodwill India Enterprise, distributed hundreds of N-95 masks for free during the Covid-19 pandemic to senior citizens, the needy and first responders and often joins flood relief efforts in different parts of India.

Notable Projects 
SgurrEnergy has been recognized by Bloomberg Finance as a top-10 consultant to developers & investors. SgurrEnergy has also written a guide for lenders that want to invest in renewable energy projects for IFC.

In addition SgurrEnergy provided lenders Dexia and Rabobank with technical advice on the €153M Thorntonbank offshore wind farm off the Belgian coast. They are also providing technical advice on the construction of the first Western-financed wind farm to be built in China.

References

Engineering consulting firms of the United Kingdom
International engineering consulting firms
Companies based in Glasgow
2002 establishments in Scotland
Companies established in 2002